Santiago Villafania is a bilingual Filipino poet who writes in English and in his native language of Pangasinan. Born in Tuliao, Sta. Barbara, Pangasinan on 31 January 1971, Villafania graduated with a degree of Bachelor of Arts in English from the University of Pangasinan in 1991. He is a member of the Philippine PEN and currently a commissioner for the Pangasinan Historical and Cultural Commission.

External links
The Sunday Punch:Santiago Villafania
[Interview with Filipino poet Santiago Villafania conducted by Sattam Haqabani and published in http://www.alriyadh.com/996794 Riyadh Newspaper]
["Aguinaldo, Dennis Andrew S. (2008). THE BELOVED IDIOM: A Reading of  Villafania’s Pinabli & Other Poems. Mabini Review, 135-136. Retrieved from http://mabinireview.weebly.com/uploads/9/0/9/1/9091667/the_mabini_review_-_final_inside_pages.pdf."]

References

Writers from Pangasinan
Filipino writers
Pangasinense writers
English-language haiku poets
Living people
1971 births